The Fatal Accidents Act 1976 (c 30) is an Act of the Parliament of the United Kingdom, that allows relatives of people killed by the wrongdoing of others to recover damages.

Background
The Fatal Accidents Act 1846 had allowed claims for damages by the relatives of deceased persons for the first time. The 1976 Act modernised the process and repealed earlier legislation.

The Act
The Act allows claims as stipulated in s. 1(1):

The Act allows claims under three heads:
Dependency claim (s. 1) - A claim for economic loss by a restricted class of "dependant" defined in s.1(3).
Bereavement claim (s. 1A) - A claim in recognition of grief by a further restricted class of "dependant", similar to a solatium in Scottish law. As of 1 May 2020, the amount of the bereavement claim award increased from £11,800 to £15,120.
Funeral expenses (s. 3(5)) of the dependants.

An award must take account of any social security benefits received (s. 4).

See also
Fatal Accidents Act

References

Bibliography
 
 Law Commission (1997) "Consultation Paper - Claims for Wrongful Death", LCCP148
 Law Commission (1999) "Claims for Wrongful Death - A Final Report", LC263

External links
The Fatal Accidents Act 1976, as amended from the National Archives.
The Fatal Accidents Act 1976, as originally enacted from the National Archives.

Acts of the Parliament of the United Kingdom concerning England and Wales
United Kingdom Acts of Parliament 1976